TG+ is a box set by Throbbing Gristle. The 10-CD set contains Throbbing Gristle live performances, all digitally remastered by Chris Carter. The set is a follow up to TG24. These recordings represent the final ten live TG recordings that were not included in the TG24 release. Other than CDs, the set contains an inlay with five laser cut metal plates that are about the size of a business card. Each plate is a variation of the TG logo.

CD information
IRCD30: Live at Oundle Public School, UK, 16 March 1980.
IRCD33: Live at Sheffield University, UK, 10 June 1980.
IRCD36: Live at SO36 Club, Berlin Germany, 7 November 1980.
IRCD37: Live at SO36 Club, Berlin Germany, 8 November 1980.
IRCD38: Live at Kunsthofschule, Frankfurt Germany, 10 November 1980.
IRCD39: Live at Rafters Club, Manchester, 4 December 1980.
IRCD40: Live at Heaven, London, 23 December 1980.
IRCD41: Live at Lyceum, London, 8 February 1981.
IRCD42: Live at Veterans Auditorium, Los Angeles USA, 22 May 1981.
IRCD43: Live at Kezar Pavilion, San Francisco USA, 29 May 1981.

Cassette information

See also
Throbbing Gristle live

References

External links

2004 live albums
2004 compilation albums
Throbbing Gristle compilation albums
Throbbing Gristle live albums